Polymita picta, also known as the Cuban painted snail, or the oriente tree snail, is a species of large, air-breathing land snail, a terrestrial pulmonate gastropod mollusk in the family Helminthoglyptidae.

It is the type species of the genus Polymita, and is endemic to Eastern Cuba.

Subspecies and varietas
Subspecies and varietas within this species include:

Polymita picta picta
Polymita picta picta var. muscata Torre 1950
Polymita picta picta var. multifasciata Torre 1950
Polymita picta picta var. dimidiata Torre 1950
Polymita picta picta var. obscurata Torre 1950
Polymita picta iolimbata Torre 1950Polymita picta iolimbata var. iofasciata Torre 1950Polymita picta iolimbata var. iosaturata Torre 1950Polymita picta iolimbata var. iodimidiata Torre 1950Polymita picta fuscolimbata Torre 1950Polymita picta fuscolimbata Torre 1950Polymita picta fuscolimbata var. elevata Torre 1950Polymita picta nigrolimbata Torre 1950Polymita picta nigrolimbata var. fulminata Torre 1950Polymita picta nigrolimbata var. nigrofasciata Torre 1950Polymita picta roseolimbata Torre 1950Polymita picta roseolimbata forma minor Torre 1950Polymita picta roseolimbata var. virgata Torre 1950Polymita picta roseolimbata var. albolimbata Torre 1950

Distribution and habitat
This snail is endemic to Cuba.They spread from the ocean to the sea of the northeastern coast. AMNH(2017).Animals of Cuba:Painted snails.Publisher.P.1 These arboreal molluscs live mainly in coastal habitats in the subtropical forest, with a preference for certain tree species including Chrysobalanus icaco, Metopium toxifera, Metopium brownei, Bursera simaruba and Coccoloba retusa.

Description
These large shells are shiny and very brightly colored. Normally they show a bright yellow color with a white stripe, but the species is well known for its colourful shell polymorphism, with numerous color varieties.

Shell colors vary (polymorphism ) depending on the diet of the snail. Some researchers suspect it is a defense mechanism to evade predators by confusing them.

These shells are sought after by poachers and used to make jewelry and trinkets. As a result, the species has become endangered. It is a protected species since 1943 by the Cuban legislation which prohibits the export except for scientific reasons.

BiologyPolymita picta mainly feeds on lichen, moss and on fungal biofilms present on bark and leaves. The life cycle lasts about 15 months, with breeding time during the wet season (September- October). The snails become dormant in the dry season (December- beginning of May).

Like most air-breathing land snails, Polymita picta'' has female and male reproductive organs (hermaphroditic),  it is unable to self-fertilize. Moreover similarly to other gastropods in the superfamily Helicoidea, this species uses love darts as part of its mating behavior. Mating can be divided into three stages: courtship, copulation and post-copulation. This can appear as wiping, running, and stabbing known as dart apparatus. During the courtship these snails spear the partner with a calcareous dart.

References

Bibliography
 Fernandez, J.M., J.R. Martinez,1987. Polymita. Ministerio de Cultura, Editorial Cientifico-Tecnica, Habana, Cuba
 Parkinson, B., J. Hemmen and K. Groh, 1987. Tropical Landshells of the World. Weisbaden.
Emilio Jorge Power. «Polymita picta». The Polymita Home Page. 
González Guillén A. (2014). "Polymita, the most beautiful land snail of the world". Carlos M. Estevez & Associates, Miami, 359 pp., .
Torre1950, "El Genero Polymita", Memorias de la Sociedad Cubana de Historia Natural "Felipe Poey", 20(1): 1-20, 11 color plates.

Helminthoglyptidae
Endemic fauna of Cuba
Gastropods described in 1778
Taxa named by Ignaz von Born